The Commissioner of Police is the head of the New Zealand Police and is currently held by Andrew Coster. The Commissioner is appointed for a term not exceeding five years by the Governor-General, and reports to the Minister of Police. The position combines two functions, that of chief constable in charge of policing and cases, and chief executive responsible for assets and budgeting. In military terms, the rank is equivalent to Lieutenant General.

History
The Police Force Act 1886 split the police from the earlier body known as the New Zealand Armed Constabulary, which had performed both civil policing functions as well as being the standing army and militia, on 1 September 1886. Sir George Whitmore was appointed as the first commissioner, reporting to the Minister of Defence. Early commissioners came from the United Kingdom with military or law enforcement experience, such as Walter Dinnie, who had served as Inspector at Scotland Yard.

In 2006, the commissioner was the highest paid person on the public payroll in New Zealand, earning $440,000.

In 2017, Mike Bush was reappointed to a second term that will run until 2020. In early March 2020, Prime Minister Jacinda Ardern appointed Andrew Coster as the new Commissioner of Police, taking effect in April 2020.

List of commissioners

Notes

References

Lists of New Zealand people by occupation
New Zealand